Henry Hargreaves may refer to:

Henry Hargreaves (footballer) (1893 – 1916), English footballer
Henry Hargreaves (photographer) (born 1979), Brooklyn-based artist and food photographer
H. A. Hargreaves (1928–2017), Henry Hargreaves, professor and science fiction writer

See also
Harry Hargreaves (disambiguation)